Diogo Brajão Soares (born 12 April 2002) is a Brazilian artistic gymnast and a member of the national team. He participated in the 2018 Youth Olympic Games and the 2019 Junior World Artistic Gymnastics Championships. He competed at the 2020 Summer Olympics.

Career

Junior
Soares' first major international competition was the 2016 Pan American Individual Event Artistic Gymnastics Championships where he won a silver medal with the Brazilian team. In 2018, Soares competed at the 2018 Summer Youth Olympics, earning a bronze medal in the all-around and a silver medal in the horizontal bar. At the 2019 Junior World Artistic Gymnastics Championships he earned a silver medal in rings.

Personal life
Diogo Soares started gymnastics at the age of 4. His sister, Driele, is a former gymnast.

References

External links

 FIG profile

2002 births
Living people
Competitors at the 2022 South American Games
Brazilian male artistic gymnasts
Gymnasts at the 2018 Summer Youth Olympics
Medalists at the Junior World Artistic Gymnastics Championships
People from Piracicaba
Gymnasts at the 2020 Summer Olympics
Olympic gymnasts of Brazil
Sportspeople from São Paulo (state)
South American Games gold medalists for Brazil
South American Games bronze medalists for Brazil
South American Games medalists in gymnastics
21st-century Brazilian people